The Tunnel is a 2019 Norwegian disaster thriller film directed by Pål Øie. The film follows the bulldozer driver Stein, played by Thorbjørn Harr, during a tunnel fire in a 9 kilometer long road tunnel.

During The Kanon Award 2019, the film won the Audience Award and was also nominated in the category to Best Producer (John Einar Hagen and Einar Loftesnes) and Best Sound Design (Hugo Ekornes). During the Amanda Award 2020, Ingvild Holthe Bygdnes won the class for Best Supporting Actress for the film.

Plot
At Christmas a tanker truck crashes in a Norwegian tunnel, causing a big fire to break out. Elise the daughter of volunteer firefighter Stein Berge is trapped with many other people in the tunnel. Now Stein and his colleagues try to save everyone.

Cast

Reception

Critical response	

References

External links 
 

Norwegian disaster films
Norwegian thriller films
Disaster thriller films
Films scored by Martin Todsharow